Thornfield Township is an inactive township in Ozark County, in the U.S. state of Missouri.

Thornfield Township was erected in 1870, taking its name from the local Thornfield family.

References

Townships in Missouri
Townships in Ozark County, Missouri